The 2005 Toyota Atlantic Championship season was contested over 12 rounds. 14 different teams and 27 different drivers competed. In this one-make formula all drivers had to utilize Swift chassis and Toyota engines. This season also saw a C2-class running older Swift chassis and Toyota engines. In C2-class 12 different drivers competed, but none of them for the whole season. The Toyota Atlantic Championship Presented by Yokohama Drivers' Champion was Charles Zwolsman Jr. driving for Condor Motorsports.

Teams and drivers

Schedule and Results

Final driver standings
Note:

Race 3, 4, 5 and 6 only one additional point awarded to the fastest qualifier, because only one session was held for each race.

In all races not all points were awarded (not enough competitors).

See also
 2005 Champ Car season
 2005 Indianapolis 500
 2005 IndyCar Series season
 2005 Infiniti Pro Series season

External links
ChampCarStats.com

References

Atlantic
Atlantic
Atlantic Championship Season, 2005
Atlantic Championship seasons
Atlantic